Frank Gant (born May 26, 1931- July 19, 2021) was an american jazz drummer.

Born in Detroit, Michigan, Gant recorded with Donald Byrd, Sonny Stitt, and extensively with Yusef Lateef in the late 1950s and then Red Garland before becoming a member of Ahmad Jamal's trio (1966-1976).

His first gigs were with Billy Mitchell and Pepper Adams, and after working with Little John Wilson and his Merry Men at the Madison Ballroom, including four days backing Billie Holiday, he went on to join Alvin Jackson's house band at the Blue Bird.

As the house drummer at Detroit's Club 12, with Jackson's band, he backed Thelonious Monk and Charlie Rouse in September 1959.

In the 1970s, he accompanied Jamil Nasser and Harold Mabern as the rhythm section for workshops run by Cobi Narita.

Discography

As sideman
With Sonny Stitt
1958: Sonny Stitt
1960: Burnin' (recorded 1958)
With Yusef Lateef
1958: Lateef at Cranbrook
1959: The Dreamer
1959: The Fabric of Jazz 
1960: Cry! - Tender  
With Red Garland
1962: The Nearness of You
1962: Solar 
With Ahmad Jamal
1966: Heat Wave
1968: Tranquility
1970: The Awakening
1971: Freeflight
1971: Outertimeinnerspace
1976: Recorded Live at Oil Can Harry's
With Al Haig
1977: Manhattan Memories (Sea Breeze, re. 1983)
With others
1955: Byrd Jazz – Donald Byrd 
1958: Breakin' It Up – Barry Harris
1964: Proof Positive – J. J. Johnson (Impulse!) 
1979: Monty Alexander in Tokyo – Monty Alexander with Gant and Andy Simpkins
1986: Moonray – Adam Makowicz with Gant, Jamil Nasser, Deborah Henson-Conant and Ed Saindon

References

Living people
American jazz drummers
1931 births
20th-century American drummers
American male drummers
20th-century American male musicians
American male jazz musicians